The Puente de los Leones (literally, Bridge of the Lions) is a historic bridge in Ponce, Puerto Rico, joining Barrio Tercero to Barrio San Antón and Barrio Machuelo Abajo. It is also the city's best known bridge. The bridge is at the western terminus of Bulevar Miguel Pou, the main gateway to the Ponce Historic Zone. The Art Deco bridge carries four lanes of vehicular traffic from the two-way Miguel Pou Boulevard. It crosses Río Portugués connecting Barrio Tercero to the west with Barrios Machuelo Abajo and San Anton to the east. It is located 0.5 km east of Plaza Las Delicias.

History

An 1818 map of the city of Ponce recorded by historian Eduardo Neumann Gandia shows that the site currently occupied by Puente de los Leones was a regular cross-way over Rio Portugués between the eastern flatlands and the village of Ponce to the west. The first permanent bridge was designed and built in 1900 with funds of the Ponce Municipal Government.  An 1899 map titled "Ponce Harbor Porto Rico, Map No. 911", by Otto Hilgard Tittmann (b.1850 - d.1938) of the U.S. Coast and Geodetic Survey and published by Julius Bien & Co Photo Lithographers, New York, New York, shows a bridge over Río Portugués at the road from Ponce to Guayama via Calle Cristina, namely today's (2018) Puerto Rico Highway 1. In 1950 it was named "Puente Blas Silva" (Blas Silva Bridge) in honor of the outstanding architect from Hormigueros who lived most of his adult life in Ponce and designed many structures in the city. The bridge was rebuilt in 1990, and reopened in 1992 at which point it was renamed Puente de los Leones as part of the festivities of the 300th anniversary of the founding of the city.

Prior to its 1992 remodeling, there was a pedestrian bridge on the east end of Puente de Los Leones because, as it existed prior to the 1990 rebuild, pedestrians walking over the bridge first had to cross the highly trafficked Bulevar Miguel Pou to use the bridge's walkway on the one side of Puente Blas Silva. But with the 1990s remodeling, Puente de Los Leones was enlarged to include walkaways on both sides of the bridge and the pedestrian overpass bridge was eliminated. The bridge now has permanent six feet wide pedestrian walkways on both sides.

Location

The bridge is Ponce's best known bridge. It is the gateway to, not just Parque del Tricentenario, but also to the Ponce Historic Zone as well. The bridge runs from west to east and is the eastern terminus of the Bulevar Miguel. To its northeast is the prestigious neighborhood of La Alhambra, the first large upper class suburban expansion developed in Puerto Rico (early 1900s).  To its southeast is the Parque Ecologico Urbano. To its west is the Parque del Tricentenario. Parque Lineal Veredas del Labrador, runs along the banks of Río Portugués, under this bridge. Two other bridges provide entry to the Ponce Historic Zone, Calle Guadalupe's Puente La Milagrosa, and Puente Avenida Betances, on the western end of Avenida Tito Castro (PR-14). However, only Puente de los Leones carries four lanes of traffic, carrying a higher volume of traffic into the Ponce Historic Zone than the other two nearby bridges.

Features
It features two brass lions guarding the entrance to the city: the older lion represents wisdom and experience, while the younger one stands for the glorious future. The two lions are the work of Spanish sculptor Victor Ochoa. Both lions are located on the western end of the bridge, on 20 feet high pedestals. Leon Joven (Young lion) in located on the north side of the bridge and Leon Sabio (Wise Lion) is located on the southern side of the bridge.

A metal plaque at the foot of the pedestal of the Leon Joven reads (Note: English translation is not part of the inscription, and it is given here to the right):

Architecture
The bridge's architectural style follows the Art Deco tradition. It has 16 lampposts, 8 on each side, and is covered with marble. The bridge's main span material is steel and its main span design is stringer/multi-beam or girder. The deck is cast-in-place concrete with a Monolithic Concrete wearing surface (concurrently placed with structural deck). It has an 89.6 feet span length, and 93.5 feet total length. The bridge was designed by architect Ilia Sánchez Arana, who also designed Paseo Arias, a.k.a., Callejón Amor, in downtown Ponce.

See also

 Puente Río Portugués
 Puente La Milagrosa

Notes

References

Further reading
 Fay Fowlie de Flores. Ponce, Perla del Sur: Una Bibliografía Anotada. Second Edition. 1997. Ponce, Puerto Rico: Universidad de Puerto Rico en Ponce. p. 41. Item 207. 
 Ilia Sanchez Arana de Ramirez. "Los puentes sobre el Rio Portugues en Ponce." Patrimonio. Volume/Year 1 (April-June 1989) p. 3 (Colegio Universitario Tecnologico de Ponce; Oficina Estatal de Preservacion Historica)

External links
 Puente de los Leones in the 1910s, looking west from today's (2021) Boulevar Miguel Pou
 Puente de los Leones in the 1910s, looking west from today's (2021) Boulevar Miguel Pou Archived (small) Archived (large)

Bridges completed in 1900
Bridges in Ponce, Puerto Rico
1900 establishments in Puerto Rico
Road bridges in North America